Me llevarás en ti is a Spanish-language historical drama film created and directed by Iván Obando basend on the book of the same name by Editorial Planeta. The film stars Carlos Fernández, Geraldine Zivic, and Mariana Fernández. The film was screened on 7 September 2019 in Bucaramanga, Colombia at the 2019 Santander International Film Festival, and is scheduled to premiere on 24 October 2019 in national cinemas.

Cast 
 Carlos Fernández as Gonzalo Mejía
 Géraldine Zivic as Isolda Prunzisky
 Mariana Fernández as Young Isolda Prunzisky
 Marcela Gutiérrez as Alicia Arango
 Gisella Zivic as Olga Landowska
 Sebastián Gómez as Wenzeslaus
 Adrian Díaz as Lato
 Gonzalo Vivanco as Captain Secundino
 Aldemar Correa as Eduardo Mejía
 María Gaviria as Marichu Mejía
 Sebastián Yatra as Himserfl

References